John Stubblefield (February 4, 1945 – July 4, 2005) was an American jazz saxophonist, flautist, and oboist.

Early life 
Stubblefield was born and raised in Little Rock, Arkansas. He studied music at the Association for the Advancement of Creative Musicians with Muhal Richard Abrams in Chicago before moving to New York City in 1971.

Career 
After moving to New York, Stubblefield played with the Mingus Big Band for 13 years. During his career, Stubblefield played with the World Saxophone Quartet (1986–1988), Reggie Workman (1989–1993), McCoy Tyner (1984), Freddie Hubbard (1985), and George Russell (1985). Stubblefield also served for a time as a jazz ensemble director at the Mason Gross School of the Arts, following the departure of Paul Jeffrey in 1983.

Discography

As leader
 Prelude (Storyville, 1976) with Onaje Allan Gumbs, Cecil McBee, Joe Chambers, James Mtume, Cecil Bridgewater
 Midnight Over Memphis (Denon, 1979)
 Midnight Sun (Sutra, 1980)
 Confessin' (Soul Note, 1984) with Cecil Bridgewater, Mulgrew Miller, Rufus Reid, Eddie Gladden
 Bushman Song (Enja, 1986) with Geri Allen, Charnett Moffett, Mino Cinelu, Victor Lewis
 Countin’ on the Blues (Enja, 1987) with Hamiet Bluiett, Mulgrew Miller, Charnett Moffett, Victor Lewis
 Sophisticatedfunk (Cheetah, 1990)
 Morning Song (Enja, 1993) with George Cables, Victor Lewis, Clint Houston

As sideman
With Nat Adderley
Don't Look Back (SteepleChase, 1976)
Hummin' (Little David, 1976)
With Kenny Barron
Golden Lotus (Muse, 1980 [1982])
What If? (Enja, 1986)
Live at Fat Tuesdays (Enja, 1988)
Quickstep (Enja, 1991)
Things Unseen (1997)
With Lester Bowie
Fast Last! (Muse, 1974)
With Anthony Braxton
Town Hall 1972 (Trio, 1972)
With Stanley Cowell
 Regeneration (Strata-East, 1976)
With Miles Davis
Get Up with It (1974)
With Craig Harris
F-Stops (Soul Note, 1993)
With Billy Hart
Amethyst (Arabesque, 1993)
Oceans of Time (Arabesque, 1997)
With Louis Hayes
The Crawl (Candid, 1989)
Una Max (SteepleChase, 1989)
With Julius Hemphill
Julius Hemphill Big Band (Elektra/Musician, 1988)
With Franklin Kiermyer
In The House Of My Fathers (Konnex, 1993)
With Abdullah Ibrahim
African River (Enja, 1989)
With Joseph Jarman
As If It Were the Seasons (1968)
With Victor Lewis
Family Portrait (AudioQuest Music, 1992)
With Maurice McIntyre
Humility in the Light of the Creator (Delmark, 1969)
With Sam Rivers
Crystals (Impulse!, 1974)
With McCoy Tyner
Sama Layuca (Milestone, 1974) 
The Turning Point (Birdology, 1991) 
Journey (Birdology, 1993)
With Larry Willis
A Tribute to Someone (AudioQuest, 1994)
With Paul (PB) Brown
Paul Brown Quartet Meets The Three Tenors (1998)

References

1945 births
2005 deaths
American jazz tenor saxophonists
American male saxophonists
American jazz soprano saxophonists
American jazz flautists
Enja Records artists
Black Saint/Soul Note artists
20th-century American saxophonists
20th-century American male musicians
American male jazz musicians
Mingus Big Band members
Storyville Records artists
Musicians from Arkansas
Musicians from Little Rock, Arkansas
20th-century flautists